Svenska Supercupen 2011, Swedish Super Cup 2011, was the 5th Svenska Supercupen, an annual football match contested by the winners of the previous season's Allsvenskan and Svenska Cupen competitions. The match was played at Swedbank Stadion, Malmö, on 19 March 2011, and was contested by league winners Malmö FF and cup winners Helsingborgs IF. The match was Malmö FF's first appearance and Helsingborgs IF's second in Supercupen since its creation. Helsingborgs IF won the match 2–1 after Erik Sundin scored the winning goal in the 90th minute.

Match facts

See also
2010 Allsvenskan
2010 Svenska Cupen

References

External links
 

Supercupen
2011
Svenska Supercupen 2011
Svenska Supercupen 2011
Svenska Supercupen 2011
Svenska Supercupen 2011